The 1985 National Rowing Championships was the 14th edition of the National Championships, held from 20–21 July 1985 at the National Water Sports Centre in Holme Pierrepont, Nottingham.

Senior

Medal summary 

 * dead heat for first place

Lightweight

Medal summary

Junior

Medal summary

Coastal

Medal summary 

Key

References 

British Rowing Championships
British Rowing Championships
British Rowing Championships